Viola nuttallii (Nuttall's violet or yellow prairie violet) is a perennial herbaceous plant in the violet family (Violaceae), and is one of the few violet species with lanceolate leaves. It is native to the western Canada and the north-central and western United States, appearing in upper steppe lands, forests, and alpine ridges.

The genus name Viola means violet in Latin. For Nuttall's violet the only purple coloring is the nectar guides in the throat of the flower. The species name is given in honor of noted botanist Thomas Nuttall.

The plant is highly variable, usually with bright yellow petals.

The species serves as a larval host for the Coronis fritillary butterfly.

References

nuttallii
Flora of Western Canada
Flora of the Northwestern United States
Flora of the North-Central United States
Flora of the Southwestern United States
Flora of New Mexico
Flora without expected TNC conservation status